The Steyr SSG 04 (German: Scharfschützengewehr 2004, English: Sniper Rifle 04) is a modern bolt-action sniper rifle developed and produced by Steyr Mannlicher in Austria, as a complement to Steyr's SSG 69, using the same Safe Bolt System (SBS) action developed for Steyr's hunting rifles. It is also the basis for the Steyr SSG 08 and Steyr SSG Carbon.

Design
There is one variant; the SSG 04 A1, which replaces the base model's Picatinny rail over the action with a shroud attached to the receiver, that covers the barrel for the length of the forend. 

Atop the shroud is a Picatinny rail that runs from the rear of the receiver to the front of the shroud, and two shorter lengths of Picatinny rail are mounted on either side of the front of the shroud.

Users 

 : SSG 04 A1 in .308 Winchester
 
 
 <ref
name="infodefensa.com"></ref>

References

7.62×51mm NATO rifles
Bolt-action rifles
Sniper rifles of Austria